is a Japanese footballer currently playing as a forward for Valencia, on loan from Tokushima Vortis.

Career statistics

Club
.

Notes

References

External links

2003 births
Living people
People from Kanagawa Prefecture
Sportspeople from Kanagawa Prefecture
Japanese footballers
Association football forwards
Tokushima Vortis players
Valencia CF players
Japanese expatriate footballers
Japanese expatriate sportspeople in Spain
Expatriate footballers in Spain
Japanese people of Ghanaian descent
Sportspeople of Ghanaian descent